Andrei Vasilyevich Zhirov (born 17 June 1971) is a Russian professional football coach and a former player.

Club career
He made his debut in the Soviet Top League in 1990 for FC Dynamo Moscow.

Honours
 Soviet Top League bronze: 1990.

References

External links
 

1971 births
People from Yaroslavsky District, Yaroslavl Oblast
Living people
Soviet footballers
Russian footballers
Association football defenders
Russian football managers
FC Dynamo Moscow players
FC Dinamo Sukhumi players
FC Bukovyna Chernivtsi players
FC Chernomorets Novorossiysk players
Soviet Top League players
Ukrainian Premier League players
Russian Premier League players
FC Tyumen players
FC Shinnik Yaroslavl players
FC Fakel Voronezh players
Russian expatriate footballers
Expatriate footballers in Ukraine
Russian expatriate sportspeople in Ukraine
Sportspeople from Yaroslavl Oblast